Pablo Andújar was the defending champion and successfully defended his title.

Andújar won the title after defeating Pedro Martínez 6–3, 3–6, 6–4 in the final.

Seeds
All seeds receive a bye into the second round.

Draw

Finals

Top half

Section 1

Section 2

Bottom half

Section 3

Section 4

References

External links
Main draw
Qualifying draw

JC Ferrero Challenger Open - Singles